Our Shining Hour is a 1965 studio album by Sammy Davis Jr., accompanied by the Count Basie Orchestra, arranged by Quincy Jones.

In 1973, MGM Records released Sammy Davis Jr. and Count Basie with an identical track listing created using alternate takes from the Our Shining Hour recording sessions in 1964 with newly recorded vocals.

Track listing
 "My Shining Hour" (Harold Arlen, Johnny Mercer) – 2:10
 "Teach Me Tonight" (Sammy Cahn, Gene de Paul) – 3:05
 "Work Song" (Nat Adderley, Oscar Brown Jr.) – 2:12
 "Why Try to Change Me Now?" (Cy Coleman, Joseph Allan McCarthy) – 3:24
 "Blues for Mr. Charlie" (Bobby Sharp) – 3:43
 "April in Paris" (Vernon Duke, Yip Harburg) – 2:45
 "New York City Blues" (Quincy Jones, Peggy Lee) – 2:51
 "You're Nobody till Somebody Loves You" (James Cavanaugh, Russ Morgan, Larry Stock) – 2:58
 "She's a Woman (W-O-M-A-N)" (Jerry Leiber and Mike Stoller) – 2:21
 "The Girl from Ipanema" (Vinícius de Moraes, Antonio Carlos Jobim, Norman Gimbel) – 4:07
 "Keepin' Out of Mischief Now" (Andy Razaf, Fats Waller) – 2:51
 "Bill Basie Won't You Please Come Home" (Count Basie, Sammy Davis, Jr., Jones) – 2:38

Personnel 
 Sammy Davis Jr. - vocals, tap
The Count Basie Orchestra
 Count Basie - piano, bandleader
 Quincy Jones - arranger, conductor
 George Rhodes - arranger
 Al Aarons - trumpet
 Sonny Cohn
 Wallace Davenport
 Joe Newman
 Snooky Young
 Henderson Chambers - trombone
 Henry Coker
 Bill Hughes
 Grover Mitchell
 Marshal Royal - clarinet, alto saxophone
 Eric Dixon - tenor saxophone
 Sal Nistico
 Charles Fowlkes - baritone saxophone
 Frank Wess - saxophone
 Freddie Green - guitar
 Ray Brown - double bass
 Sonny Payne - drums
 Emil Richards - percussion

References

1965 albums
Count Basie Orchestra albums
Sammy Davis Jr. albums
Verve Records albums
Albums arranged by Quincy Jones
Albums conducted by Quincy Jones